Abyssal Spider, also known as Mad Spider Sea, is a 2020 Taiwanese monster thriller film directed by Joe Chien. It stars Wang Yangming, Zheng Renshuo, and Ko Chia-yen, and follows the crew of a boat threatened by a dangerous storm and a colossal aquatic spider.

The film was released in Taiwan on 11 September 2020.

Premise
During an attempt to rescue a tanker in a storm, a search and rescue crew witnesses a large shadow beneath the waves and is pulled into the sea. Years later, lone survivor Ajie boards a boat which becomes lost in a storm, and must work together with his fellow crewmates to survive against both the weather and a number of creatures lurking underwater, including a giant aquatic spider.

Release

Marketing
A trailer for the film was uploaded to YouTube on 19 August 2020. A second trailer was released on 4 September 2020, followed by a third trailer on 24 September.

References

External links
 Official Facebook page
 

2020 films
2020s monster movies
2020s disaster films
2020 thriller films
Films about spiders
Films set on boats
Giant monster films
Kaiju films
Taiwanese disaster films
Taiwanese-language films
Taiwanese thriller films